Actinobacillus succinogenes is a bacterium. It is a succinic acid-producing strain first isolated from the bovine rumen. It is a facultatively anaerobic, pleomorphic, Gram-negative rod. Its type strain is ATCC 55618T.

References

Further reading

Zheng, Pu, et al. "Enhanced succinic acid production by Actinobacillus succinogenes after genome shuffling." Journal of industrial microbiology & biotechnology (2013): 1–10.

External links

Type strain of Actinobacillus succinogenes at BacDive -  the Bacterial Diversity Metadatabase

Pasteurellales
Bacteria described in 1999